Ume is a Japanese name for Prunus mume, a species of Asian plum in the family Rosaceae.

Ume may also refer to:

Japanese 
 Japanese ship Ume, the name of several Japanese ships
Ume (song), a 2013 song by Shiritsu Ebisu Chūgaku
Ume Kenjirō (1860–1910), legal scholar and a founder of Hosei University in Meiji Japan
Ume Matsuzaka, a character from the manga/anime Crayon Shin Chan

Languages
Umê script, a form of Tibetan writing
Ume, a dialect of the Isoko language of Nigeria
Ume, a dialect of the Wipi language, an Eastern Trans-Fly language of Papua New Guinea

Places
Ume, Ōita, a town in Minamiamabe District, Ōita, Japan
Ume River, one of the main rivers in northern Sweden
Ume Sami, one of the Sami languages of Northern Europe
Umeå, a Swedish city

People
Ume Warqa, companion of the Islamic prophet Muhammad

UME (acronym)
Military Emergencies Unit or Emergency Military Unit (Unidad Militar de Emergencias), a branch of the Spanish Armed Forces
University of Maine
The IATA airport code for Umeå Airport in Alvik, Umeå, Sweden
Universal Music Enterprises, the catalogue division of Universal Music Group
Ubuntu Mobile & Embedded, a version of the Ubuntu Linux distribution aimed at mobile devices
Ultramicroelectrode, in electrochemistry